PSAT may refer to:
 PSAT/NMSQT, a standardized test in the United States
 Phosphoserine transaminase, an enzyme
 Palm Springs Aerial Tramway
 Pop-up satellite archival tag
 The problem of Probabilistic Satisfiability in Probabilistic logic
 ParkinsonSAT, a technology demonstration and amateur radio satellite